Raymond Neville Kirkham (born 16 December 1934) is an English former professional footballer who played in the Football League for Mansfield Town.

References

1934 births
Living people
English footballers
Association football goalkeepers
English Football League players
Mansfield Town F.C. players